Pragoscutulidae is an extinct taxonomic family of marine gastropod molluscs.

References

Prehistoric gastropods